Osborne Township may refer to:

Canada 
 Osborne Township, Ontario

United States 
 Osborne Township, Sumner County, Kansas, in Sumner County, Kansas
 Osborne Township, Pipestone County, Minnesota

	
Township name disambiguation pages